Marcella Runell Hall (born January 10, 1975) is an American-born author and educator. She is best known for her social justice work, her founding of the Of Many Institute for Multifaith Leadership at New York University, and her current role as Dean of Students at Mount Holyoke College.

Hall was appointed Dean of Students at Mount Holyoke College in June 2014 and supported the school's transition to a new admissions policy allowing applications from transgender women in September 2014.

Hall is also a “a leading scholar on the interweaving between social justice, activism, hip-hop, and faith.”. In 2014, Hall was awarded NYU’s MLK Faculty Award for esteemed instructors who exemplify the spirit of Martin Luther King Jr.

Personal life 
Hall was born in Washington D.C. and spent the majority of her childhood in locations across the northeast – the most notable being Ocean City, New Jersey. She met her husband David Hall in the fall of 2002 while studying at the University of Massachusetts, Amherst, and they have been married since May 2007. Her husband is a disc-jockey on WBLS with the stage-name DJ Trends, and together they have two daughters.

Education and academic life 
Hall earned her doctorate in social justice education from the University of Massachusetts, Amherst (UMASS) in 2011. Her dissertation is titled, Education in a Hip-Hop Nation: Our Identity, Politics & Pedagogy. Prior to UMASS, she studied at New York University, receiving a Master of Arts in higher education administration with a focus on multicultural education. She holds a bachelor's degree in social work with a concentration in women's Studies from Ramapo College of New Jersey.

Professional life 
Prior to her deanship at Mount Holyoke, Hall served as the founding director (Internal Relations) for the Of Many Institute for Multifaith Leadership at New York University, where she co-led the Institute and Center with Yael Shy. The Of Many Institute is a first-of-its-kind, providing academic and co-curricular programming to students from diverse religious backgrounds in an effort to equip New York University students with the skills necessary to reach across faith boundaries and foster dialogue and respect, while still remaining rooted in their own religious and spiritual traditions. The Institute and the Center's programmatic activities have frequently been featured in prominent news sources, including The Huffington Post. The Institute was founded by Chelsea Clinton, Linda Mills, Rabbi Yehuda Sarna, and Imam Khalid Latif. Among Hall’s most notable contributions to The Institute are her creation of the Multifaith Minor in Spiritual Leadership, her Faith Zone religious literacy pedagogy workshop Faith Zone (recipient of 2014 Inaugural Spirituality and Religion in Higher Education "Outstanding Spiritual Initiative" Award) and her contribution to Chelsea Clinton’s 2014 debut documentary film on Muslim-Jewish relations, Of Many.
In addition to her recent titles of founding director (Internal Relations) for the Of Many Institute at New York University and clinical instructor for NYU's Silver School of Social Work, Dr. Hall served as a founding board member for the Hip-Hop Education Center. Runell Hall also served at NYU's Center for Multicultural Education and Programs (CMEP) for from 2007–2012 in various position including Diversity Educator, Associate Director, and finally, Interim Director. During her time at CMEP, Hall co-founded the Administrator’s Cultural Training Institute, the Hip-Hop Pedagogy Initiative, the Intergroup Dialogue Program, and NYU’s Ally Week, all for which she received awards from the National Association of Student Affairs Professionals (NASPA). Hall also previously served as an Education Fellow at the Tanenbaum Center for Interreligious Understanding.

Dr. Runell Hall has been the recipient of several teaching awards over the course of her career, including the K. Patricia Cross Future Leaders Award, which she received in 2009 from the Association of American Colleges and Universities. She has been mentioned and featured in various media outlets, including Rethinking Schools, Madame Noire, The Hip Hop Project, Teaching for Change, Black Issues Book Review, Harambee Radio Network, Open Line Media News and Congress.org.

Hall appears in the JFK Presidential Legacy Gallery for her work and influence as a leading figure in innovation and civil rights alongside President Jimmy Carter, Madeleine Albright, Sandra Day O'Conner, Alan Brinkley, and others. Dr. Runell Hall has edited three award-winning books: The Hip-hop Education Guidebook: Volume 1 (2007) with Martha Diaz, Conscious Women Rock the Page: Using Hip-Hop Fiction to Incite Social Change (2008), and Love, Race & Liberation: 'Til the White Day is Done (2010) with Jennifer Calderon. Love, Race, & Liberation has received particular attention: the book was named finalist for the National Indie Excellence Book Award for Social Change, and has also been praised by notable social justice scholar and Princeton professor Dr. Cornel West. Additionally, Hall has written for Scholastic Books, the New York Times Learning Network, Vibe, and various academic journals, including Equity and Excellence in Education.

References 

1975 births
Living people
University of Massachusetts Amherst College of Education alumni
New York University alumni
Ramapo College alumni